Black Island is an island  long, lying close southwest of Skua Island in the Argentine Islands, Wilhelm Archipelago. It was charted and named descriptively in 1935 by the British Graham Land Expedition under John Rymill.

See also 
 List of Antarctic and sub-Antarctic islands
 Runciman Rock

References 

Islands of the Wilhelm Archipelago